Torn Hearts is a 2022 American horror film directed by Brea Grant and written by Rachel Koller Croft. The film stars Katey Sagal, Abby Quinn, Alexxis Lemire, Joshua Leonard and Shiloh Fernandez. Jason Blum serves as an executive producer through his Blumhouse Television banner. 

The film was released digitally on May 20, 2022 by Epix and Paramount Home Entertainment.

Plot
A country music duo seek out the private mansion of their idol and end up in a twisted series of horrors that force them to confront the limits they'd go for their dreams. Leigh (Alexxis Lemire) and Jordan (Abby Quinn), singer and songwriter, respectively, together constitute the Nashville band “Torn Hearts.” On the rise, they are looking for a break on the tour of a famed country singer, Caleb Crawford (Shiloh Fernandez), who, after Jordan hooks up with him for a night, tells her that the tour is “all-guys.” With this chance gone, Jordan talks Leigh into approaching their idol, Harper Dutch (Katey Sagal), of the Dutch Sisters, whose address Jordan got from Caleb, and recording a song with her.

After reaching the old and worn-out Dutch manor, Leigh and Jordan receive an odd welcome from Harper Dutch. Her sister Hope Dutch (the other half of their band, the Dutch Sisters), was murdered when they were young and famous, after which Harper left singing. While Leigh and Jordan have a motive of their own, Harper, too, has a motive of her own, one that isn’t as virtuous. There’s booze, there’s bad blood. In the second half of the film, we see how Harper is able to spark a fight between Leigh and Jordan by poking at their difference of opinions. It is interesting and bizarre to see how two long-time friends, no less than sisters, also have so much to tell about each other. This is not to say that Harper was successful in executing her plan, but is rather proof that Leigh and Jordan accepted their criticisms of each other, compromised for one another, and chose to stay together because they both loved the same thing, music, and knew that they were better off together. Furthermore, Leigh even admitted to Harper that she “picked” Jordan after “four or five” girls. This is where Harper connects with her and not Jordan, as she says towards the end when both the girls are pointing guns at her. Just like Leigh knew that she wouldn’t have achieved whatever she had without Jordan, Harper, too, knew that without Hope, success wouldn’t have come to her. Then, finally, at the end of the film, it is Jordan who shoots and kills Harper, but by then, Harper has already been able to plant the “story” seed inside Leigh’s head. Leigh’s shooting of Jordan only ascertains the fact that Leigh’s want for fame was much more than her love for Jordan. This was pretty much the case with Harper too, who wanted fame and found it in the “story” that made the news after the death of Hope Dutch, which is a traditional trend. Whenever a popular singer passes away, his or her songs reclaim the top spots on the charts. With Jordan dead, Leigh, too, would have a tragic story to tell the world that would make more people listen to their songs and thus make her popular. But this doesn’t happen.  Before Leigh can leave the Dutch manor, a fatally wounded Jordan shoots Leigh, and they both die. Perhaps the end is befitting for the “Torn Hearts” duo as they both lose their lives at each other’s hands, just like they were earning fame together. It is, as we said earlier, tragic to think that two girls who would have made a tremendous musical band and knew that they could do it together end up dead and that too after a fallout with each other.

Cast
 Katey Sagal as Harper Dutch
 Abby Quinn as Jordan Wilder
 Alexxis Lemire as Leigh Blackhouse
 Joshua Leonard as Richie Rowley Jones
 Shiloh Fernandez as Caleb Crawford

Production
In July 2021, Tattered Hearts was announced as part of Blumhouse Television and Epix's TV movie deal, with Brea Grant directing and Rachel Koller Croft writing, with Katey Sagal and Alexxis Lemire starring in the film.

Release
The film was released digitally in the United States by Epix and Paramount Home Entertainment on May 20, 2022.

Critical response

References

External links

2022 films
2022 horror films
2020s American films
2020s English-language films
American horror thriller films
Blumhouse Productions films
MGM+ original films